The 2020 Philadelphia Freedoms season was the 20th season of the franchise (in its current incarnation) in World TeamTennis (WTT).

Season recap

As a result of the COVID-19 pandemic, all World Team Tennis matches were moved to The Greenbrier “America's Resort” in White Sulphur Springs, West Virginia. The Freedoms were previously scheduled to play home matches at the Hagan Arena at St. Joseph's University.

Team Personnel

On-court personnel
 Craig Kardon, Head Coach  
 Caroline Dolehide
 Taylor Fritz
 Sofia Kenin
 Fabrice Martin
 Taylor Townsend
 Donald Young

Front office
 Billie Jean King – Owner

Results

Regular season
Color Key: Win  Loss - Reference:

Playoffs

Semifinals

References

Philadelphia Freedoms 2020
Philadelphia Freedoms season